Rivand (also Romanized as Rīvand) is a village in Astaneh Rural District, in the Central District of Roshtkhar County, Razavi Khorasan Province, Iran. At the 2006 census, its population was 145, in 36 families.

References 

Populated places in Roshtkhar County